BGR Township (Bongaigaon Refinery Township) is a census town in Bongaigaon Urban Agglomeration, India. It is near the National Highway 31.

Guest Houses
 Manas Guest House
 Deosri Guest House
 Manjira House

Clubs
 RCCC Club & Auditorium
 Champa Club & Play Hub

Schools
 BGR HS School
 Delhi Public School, Dhaligaon
 Natakachal Sangeet Mahavidyalaya

Transport
Transportation facilities for the town are the same as those of Bongaigaon City.

Train

Bongaigaon falls under the Northeast Frontier Railway zone of Indian Railways. There are two stations in Bongaigaon: New Bongaigaon railway station (2nd largest railway junction of Assam state) and Bongaigaon (old) station. Major trains serving Bongaigaon with major cities are Guwahati Rajdhani Express, Poorvottar Sampark Kranti Express, Saraighat Express, Brahmaputra Mail, North-East Express, Guwahati Bangalore Express, Guwahati Ernakulam Express, Kamrup Express.

It is the largest station in Western Assam after Guwahati. According to 2012 budget, New Bongaigaon Jn. is considered to be the Adarsh Station of India.

Road
National Highway 31 connects Bongaigaon with the states Bihar, Jharkhand and West Bengal. National Highway 37 via Naranarayan Setu from Goalpara in Assam to Dimapur in Nagaland traverses the entire length of Assam and connects Bongaigaon with almost all the major cities of Assam including the cities of Jorhat and Dibrugarh. National Highway 31C connects Bongaigaon To Guwahati and National Highway 37 also connects Bongaigaon with Guwahati. There are many Bus Terminal like -ASTC Bongaigaon, Barpara Private, Chapaguri Bus Stand. There are many buses which connect Bongaigaon with the major cities of Assam, such as Mangaldai Dhubri, Barpeta, Tezpur, Goalpara, Kokrajhar, Siliguri, Cooch Behar and Guwahati, among others.

References

Cities and towns in Bongaigaon district
Bongaigaon
Neighbourhoods in Bongaigaon
Townships in India